The following list is a complete collection of results for the PNG Kumuls.

Results

Victories are shown in bold.

2019: Papua New Guinea def. Great Britain 28–10, National Football Stadium, Port Moresby 
2019: Fiji def. Papua New Guinea 22–20, Rugby League Park, Christchurch, New Zealand.
2019: Samoa def. Papua New Guinea 24–6, Leichhardt Oval, Sydney , Australia.
2018: Papua New Guinea def. Fiji 26–14, Campbelltown Sports Stadium, Australia
2017: England def. Papua New Guinea 36–6, Melbourne Rectangular Stadium, Australia – 2017 Rugby League World Cup Q/Final
2017: Papua New Guinea def. United States 64–0, National Football Stadium, Port Moresby – 2017 Rugby League World Cup
2017: Papua New Guinea def. Ireland 14–6, National Football Stadium, Port Moresby – 2017 Rugby League World Cup
2017: Papua New Guinea def. Wales 50–6, National Football Stadium, Port Moresby – 2017 Rugby League World Cup
2017: Papua New Guinea def. Cook Islands 32–22, Campbelltown Sports Stadium, Campbelltown, Australia.
2016: Papua New Guinea def. Fiji 24–22, Pirtek Stadium, Parramatta, New South Wales, Australia.
2015: Fiji def. Papua New Guinea 22–10, Robina Stadium, Gold Coast, Queensland, Australia.
2014: Papua New Guinea def. Tonga 32–18, Sir Ignatius Kilage Stadium (Lae), Papua New Guinea
2013: New Zealand def. Papua New Guinea 56–10, Headingley Carnegie Stadium (Leeds), England – 2013 Rugby League World Cup
2013: Samoa def. Papua New Guinea 38–4, Craven Park (Hull), England – 2013 Rugby League World Cup
2013: France def. Papua New Guinea 9–8, Craven Park (Hull), England – 2013 Rugby League World Cup
2010: England def. Papua New Guinea 36–10, Eden Park, New Zealand – 2010 Four Nations
2010: New Zealand def. Papua New Guinea 76–12, Rotorua International Stadium, New Zealand – 2010 Four Nations
2010: Australia def. Papua New Guinea 42–0, Parramatta Stadium – 2010 Four Nations
2009: Papua New Guinea def. Cook Islands 42–14, Port Moresby – 2009 Pacific cup final
2009: Papua New Guinea def. Tonga 44–14, Port Moresby – 2009 Pacific Cup
2008: Australia def. Papua New Guinea 46–6, Dairy Farmers Stadium (Townsville) 2008 World Cup
2008: New Zealand def. Papua New Guinea 48–6 Skilled Park (Robina) 2008 World Cup
2008: England def. Papua New Guinea 32–22 Dairy Fairmers Stadium (Townsville) 2008 World Cup
2007: France def. Papua New Guinea 38–26 Parc des Sports (Avignon)
2007: France def Papua New Guinea 22–16 Stade Andre Moga, Begles (Bordeaux)
2007: Wales def Papua New Guinea 50–10 Bridgend, Wales
2005: Australia def. Papua New Guinea 70–22 Dairy Farmers Stadium, Townsville
2001: Australia def. Papua New Guinea 54–12 Lloyd Robson (Port Moresby)
2001: Papua New Guinea def. France 34–24 Danny Leahy Oval (Goroka)
2001: France def. Papua New Guinea 27–16 Lloyd Robson (Port Moresby)
2000: Wales def. Papua New Guinea 22–8	Widnes, England (2000 World Cup Quarter Final)
2000: Papua New Guinea def. Tonga 30–22 St. Esteve, France (2000 World Cup)
2000: Papua New Guinea def. South Africa 16–0 Toulouse, France (2000 World Cup)
2000: Papua New Guinea def. France 23–20 Stade Charlety, Paris, France (2000 World Cup)
2000: Australia def. Papua New Guinea 82–0 Dairy Dairmers Stadium (Townsville)
2000: Papua New Guinea def. Tonga 22–18 Lloyd Robson (Port Moresby) 
1998: Papua New Guinea def. Tonga 54–12 Lloyd Robson (Port Moresby)
1998: Papua New Guinea def. Tonga 44–28 Wabag
1998: Papua New Guinea def. Cook Islands 46–6 Lae
1998: Fiji def. Papua New Guinea 14–10 Lloyd Robson (Port Moresby)
1998: Papua New Guinea def. Fiji 34–12 Minj, Papua New Guinea
1998: Papua New Guinea def. Fiji 16–14 Lautoka, Fiji
1996: New Zealand def. Papua New Guinea 64–0 Palmerston North Showgrounds
1996: New Zealand def. Papua New Guinea 62–8 International Stadium, Rotorua
1996: Great Britain def. Papua New Guinea 32–30 Lae
1996: Australia def. Papua New Guinea 52–6 Lloyd Robson (Port Moresby)
1996: Papua New Guinea def. Tonga 56–19 Hubert Murray Stadium, Port Moresby
1995: New Zealand def. Papua New Guinea 22–6 Knowsley Road, St. Helens, England (1995 World Cup)
1995: Papua New Guinea drew Tonga 28–28 The Boulevarde, Hull, England (1995 World Cup)
1994: New Zealand def. Papua New Guinea 30–16 Lloyd Robson (Port Moresby)
1994: New Zealand def. Papua New Guinea 28–12 Danny Leahy Oval (Goroka)
1994: Papua New Guinea def. France 29–22 Lloyd Robson (Port Moresby)
1993: Papua New Guinea def. Fiji 35–24 Lloyd Robson (Port Moresby)
1992: Australia def. Papua New Guinea 36–14 Townsville Sports Reserve
1992: New Zealand def. Papua New Guinea 66–10 Carlaw Park (Auckland)
1992: Great Britain def. Papua New Guinea 20–14 Lloyd Robson (Port Moresby)
1991: France def. Papua New Guinea 28–14 Stade Albert Domec (Carcassonne)
1991: Great Britain def. Papua New Guinea 56–4 Central Park, Wigan, England
1991: Wales def. Papua New Guinea 68–0 Vetch Field (Swansea)
1991: Australia def. Papua New Guinea 40–6 Lloyd Robson (Port Moresby)
1991: Australia def. Papua New Guinea 58–2 Danny Leahy Oval (Goroka)
1991: France def. Papua New Guinea 20–18 Danny Leahy Oval (Goroka)
1990: New Zealand def. Papua New Guinea 18–10 Lloyd Robson (Port Moresby)
1990: New Zealand def. Papua New Guinea 36–4 Danny Leahy Oval (Goroka)
1990: Great Britain def. Papua New Guinea 40–8 Lloyd Robson (Port Moresby)
1990: Papua New Guinea def. Great Britain 20–18 Danny Leahy Oval (Goroka)
1988: Australia def. Papua New Guinea 70–8 Eric Weissel Oval (Wagga Wagga)
1988: New Zealand def. Papua New Guinea 66–14 Carlaw Park (Auckland)
1988: Great Britain def. Papua New Guinea 42–22 Lloyd Robson (Port Moresby)
1987: France def. Papua New Guinea 21–4 Stade Albert Domec (Carcassonne)
1987: Great Britain def. Papua New Guinea 42–0 Wigan, England
1987: New Zealand def. Papua New Guinea 36–22 Lloyd Robson (Port Moresby)
1986: Australia def. Papua New Guinea 62–12 Lloyd Robson (Port Moresby)
1986: Papua New Guinea def. New Zealand 24–22 Lloyd Robson (Port Moresby)
1986: New Zealand def. Papua New Guinea 36–26 Lloyd Robson(Port Moresby)
1984: Great Britain def. Papua New Guinea 38–20 Pope John Paul II Oval (Mt Hagen)
1983: New Zealand def. Papua New Guinea 60–20 Carlaw Park (Auckland)
1982: Australia def. Papua New Guinea 38–2 Lloyd Robson (Port Moresby)
1982: New Zealand def. Papua New Guinea 56–5 Lloyd Robson (Port Moresby)
1981: Papua New Guinea drew France 13–13 Lloyd Robson (Port Moresby)
1979: France def. Papua New Guinea 15–2 Stade Albert Domec (Carcassonne)
1979: France def. Papua New Guinea 16–9 Stade Municipal (Albi)
1978: New Zealand def. Papua New Guinea 30–21 Lloyd Robson (Port Moresby)
1977: Papua New Guinea def France 37–6 Lloyd Robson (Port Moresby)
1975: England def. Papua New Guinea 40–12 Lloyd Robson (Port Moresby)

See also

Papua New Guinea National Rugby League
Papua New Guinea national rugby league team
Rugby league in Papua New Guinea

References

External links
 Papua New Guinea results at rugbyleagueproject.org

Tours
Papua New Guinea
International rugby league competitions hosted by Papua New Guinea
Rugby League Four Nations